The following is a complete list of the Mayors of Fargo, North Dakota.

†Mayor Walaker died while in office.
‡Deputy Mayor Mahoney served as acting mayor until he won a special election for the balance of Walaker's term.

See also
 Timeline of Fargo, North Dakota

References

Fargo
Mayors of Fargo, North Dakota